Walter Lawrence Ramsdell (26 June 1860 – 25 August 1909) was a Massachusetts politician who served as the 28th Mayor of Lynn, Massachusetts.

1898 Congressional Race
In 1898 Ramsdell was the nominee of the Democratic party for election to congress from Massachusetts's 7th congressional district, losing to future Congressman Ernest W. Roberts.

He died in 1909 at Danvers.

Notes

External links
Mayors of the City of Lynn since its incorporation in 1850.  From the official website of the City of Lynn.

Mayors of Lynn, Massachusetts
1860 births
1909 deaths